Maldarelli is a surname. Notable people with the surname include: 

Federico Maldarelli (1826–1893), Italian painter
Gennaro Maldarelli (c.1796–1858), Italian painter
Oronzio Maldarelli (1892–1963), American sculptor and painter

Italian-language surnames